The 1912–13 Northern Rugby Football Union season was the 18th season of rugby league football.

Season summary

Huddersfield ended the regular season as league leaders and then defeated Wigan 29-2 in the play-off final to win their second Championship in as many seasons.

The Challenge Cup Winners were Huddersfield who defeated Warrington 9-5.

Ebbw Vale dropped out.

Matches between Wakefield Trinity and Coventry, and Bramley and York were cancelled.

Huddersfield's Australian  Albert Rosenfeld broke his own record of 76 tries in a season which he set last year by scoring 80 this season.

Wigan won the Lancashire League, and Huddersfield won the Yorkshire League. Wigan beat Rochdale Hornets 21–5 to win the Lancashire Cup, and Batley beat Hull F.C. to win the Yorkshire County Cup.

Championship

Championship play-off

Huddersfield's Douglas Clark scored a hat-trick of tries in his side's victory in the Championship final.

Challenge Cup

Huddersfield defeated Warrington 9-5 at Leeds in front of a crowd of 22,754.

This was Hudderfield’s first Challenge Cup win in their first Final appearance.

Sources
1912-13 Rugby Football League season at wigan.rlfans.com
The Challenge Cup at The Rugby Football League website

References

1912 in English rugby league
1913 in English rugby league
Northern Rugby Football Union seasons